HWU or Hwu may refer to:

 HWU transmitter, a French submarine communications array
 Heriot-Watt University, in Edinburgh, Scotland
 Hollywood Undead, an American rap-rock band
 Hsing Wu University, a university in New Taipei, Taiwan
 Wen-mei Hwu, American engineer